Al-Olaya, also spelled as al-`Ulaya, is a growing financial district mostly in the sub-municipality of its namesake, Baladiyah al-Ulaya, and partially in Baladiyah al-Malaz and Baladiyah al-Ma'dher in Riyadh, Saudi Arabia. 
Located on the north side of the city, it hosts sites and local landmarks, such as the Kingdom Centre, which houses the Four Seasons luxury hotel. It will also contain Al Rajhi Tower, which, upon its completion, will be the tallest building in Saudi Arabia.

Landmarks
The following are local landmarks:

 Kingdom Centre, the second tallest building in Saudi Arabia. It was opened in late 2001 with a height of 302m.
 Al Faisaliyah Center, the first skyscraper in Saudi Arabia.
 King Faisal Foundation, a charity foundation.
 Najd National Schools, a private school founded in 1983.

Future projects
 Al Rajhi Tower, which was planned to be the tallest building in Saudi Arabia. Overtook by Abraj Al Bait Hotel Tower in Makkah.

References

Neighbourhoods in Riyadh
Economy of Riyadh
Central business districts